Corey Lavelle Brewer (born January 2, 1975) is an American former professional basketball player.

After graduating from West Memphis High School, Brewer attended and played basketball at Navarro Junior College (1994–1995) and Carl Albert State College (1995–1996) before transferring to the University of Oklahoma, where he played two seasons for coach Kelvin Sampson. The ,  point guard was named to the Under-22 USA Basketball Team in July 1997.

Brewer was selected by the Miami Heat with the 51st overall pick in the 1998 NBA Draft, but spent the 1998–1999 season in the Continental Basketball Association, playing for the Grand Rapids Hoops. He was signed by the Heat on September 29, 1999, but was waived a month later without playing in any NBA games.

The 1999–2000 season found Brewer in the IBL's New Mexico Slam, after which he began playing for European teams such as Italian second division (Serie A2) teams Fila Biella (2000–2001), before moving to Spain's ACB, where he played for CB Sevilla (2001–2002) and CB Estudiantes (2002–2004). He then returned to Italy, playing for Caffè Maxim Bologna (2004–2005), moving on to Greece's Aris BC (2005–2006) and Belgium's Spirou Charleroi. He spent the 2007–2008 season playing for KK Zadar in Croatia. During 2008–2009, Brewer played for ASK Riga and prior to the 2010–11 season, he signed with Lleida of the LEB Oro League.

Personal life
At age fifteen, Brewer survived a shotgun wound after reportedly trying to mediate a street altercation.

Notes

External links
Profile by e-basket.pl
Corey Brewer - Player Card, ESPN.com

1975 births
Living people
ABA League players
African-American basketball players
American expatriate basketball people in Belgium
American expatriate basketball people in Croatia
American expatriate basketball people in Greece
American expatriate basketball people in Italy
American expatriate basketball people in Latvia
American expatriate basketball people in Spain
American expatriate basketball people in Turkey
American shooting survivors
Aris B.C. players
ASK Riga players
Basketball players from Arkansas
CB Estudiantes players
Real Betis Baloncesto players
Grand Rapids Hoops players
Navarro Bulldogs basketball players
Karşıyaka basketball players
KK Zadar players
Liga ACB players
Miami Heat draft picks
New Mexico Slam players
Oklahoma Sooners men's basketball players
Pallacanestro Biella players
People from West Memphis, Arkansas
Point guards
Spirou Charleroi players
Virtus Bologna players
American men's basketball players
Universiade medalists in basketball
Universiade gold medalists for the United States
Medalists at the 1997 Summer Universiade
21st-century African-American sportspeople
20th-century African-American sportspeople